Albert Hilton Ernest "Pud" Kent (4 November 1877 – 15 October 1923) was a Canadian football player and coach who was the head coach of the Toronto Argonauts from 1901 to 1903. From the late 1900s to the 1910s, he was a referee for Canadian football and rugby games. He was the team captain until 1902. He was also a rower, and competed in the men's eight event at the 1912 Summer Olympics.

References

External links
 
 

1877 births
1923 deaths
Canadian male rowers
Olympic rowers of Canada
Rowers at the 1912 Summer Olympics
Rowers from Toronto
Toronto Argonauts coaches